Events from the year 1597 in Sweden

Incumbents
 Monarch – Sigismund

Events

 February 24 - End of the Cudgel War.
 - Bad harvests again cause famine. 
 - The Riksdag of Arboga confirm Duke Charles as regent, and the loyalists of the King flees to Poland.

Births

Deaths

 January 27 - Jacob Ilkka, rebel leader of the Cudgel war  (born 1545) 
 13 April - Klaus Fleming, admiral and governor  (born 1535) 
 19 July - Gunilla Bielke, queen   (born 1568) 
 20 November - Princess Elizabeth of Sweden, princess   (born 1549) 
 11 November - Gustav of Saxe-Lauenburg, prince   (born 1570)

References

 
Years of the 16th century in Sweden
Sweden